The Prime Tower, also named "Maag-Tower" in an earlier stage of planning, is a skyscraper (Hochhaus) in Zurich, Switzerland.

The building is located near the Hardbrücke railway station in Zürich West of the Industriequartier. The tower replaces an industrial facility.

According to its developers, the tower's construction, which took 15 years to plan and execute, was a financial success, with its valuation based on lease rates exceeding the construction cost by CHF 110 million.

A webcam on top of the building offers a 360° view of Zürich.

Residents 
The tower and its two companion buildings, Cubus and Diagonal, are used primarily as office buildings. As of its opening in December 2011, the tower hosts the "Clouds" bar and restaurant on its top floor, a conference center, the Hotel Rivington & Sons on the ground floor, as well as the offices of Deutsche Bank Schweiz, Homburger AG, Transammonia, Korn/Ferry International, Citibank Switzerland, Infosys, Repower AG, Ernst & Young, Zürcher Kantonalbank, Nexxiot AG and consulting companies.

Gallery

References

External links
 
 Prime Tower website
 Webcam summary from April 2008 to October 2011
 

Skyscrapers in Switzerland
Office buildings completed in 2011
Buildings and structures in Zürich
Skyscraper office buildings
21st-century architecture in Switzerland